The British Geological Survey (BGS) is a partly publicly funded body which aims to advance geoscientific knowledge of the United Kingdom landmass and its continental shelf by means of systematic surveying, monitoring and research.

The BGS headquarters are in Keyworth, Nottinghamshire, England. Its other centres are located in Edinburgh, Wallingford, Cardiff and London. The current motto of the BGS is: Gateway to the Earth.

History and previous names 
The Geological Survey was founded in 1835 by the Board of Ordnance as the Ordnance Geological Survey, under Henry De la Beche. This was the world's first national geological survey. It remained a branch of the Ordnance Survey for many years. In 1965, it was merged with the Geological Museum and Overseas Geological Surveys, under the name of Institute of Geological Sciences. On 1 January 1984, the institute was renamed the British Geological Survey (and often referred to as the BGS), a name still carried today.

Competences 

The BGS advises the British government on all aspects of geoscience, as well as providing impartial advice on geological matters to the public, academics and industry. BGS is a component body of UK Research and Innovation which "works in partnership with universities, research organisations, businesses, charities, and government to create the best possible environment for research and innovation to flourish". The core outputs of the BGS include geological, geophysical, geochemical and hydrogeological maps, descriptions and related digital databases. Scientists at the BGS produced the first comprehensive map of African groundwater reserves.  One of the key strategic aims for the next decade is to complete the transition from  2-D mapping to a 3-D modelling culture. The BGS has an annual budget of £57 million, about half of which comes from the government's science budget, with the remainder coming from commissioned research from the public and private sectors.

See also 
 Geospatial Commission
 Systems geology

References

External links 
 
 BGS Annual Report
 BGS International
 Landslides at BGS.ac.uk

 
1835 establishments in the United Kingdom
Geological surveys
Geology of the United Kingdom
Natural Environment Research Council
National geological agencies
Organizations established in 1835
Rushcliffe
Science and technology in Nottinghamshire